The Corps of Army Air Defence (abbreviated as AAD), is an active corps of the Indian Army and a major combat support arm tasked with air defence of the country from foreign threats. The AAD is responsible for the protection of Indian air space from enemy aircraft and missiles, especially below 5,000 feet.

The history of the AAD dates back to 1939 during the times of the British Raj in India. The corps actively took part in the Second World War fighting on behalf of the British Empire. Post independence, the corps has participated in all the wars involving India, starting from the 1947 Indo-Pakistani War to the 1999 Kargil conflict.

The corps enjoyed autonomous status from 1994, after the bifurcation of the Corps of Air Defence Artillery from the Army's Regiment of Artillery. A separate training school, the Army Air Defence College (AADC), was established to train its personnel.

History and origin

Pre-independence

Air defence artillery in India was first established by the British Government ruling India in 1939, at the start of World War II to counter the growing aerial threat from the Axis powers, especially from the Japanese in East Asia. A small number of Indian troops were initially trained to use 3-inch Ack-Ack guns and in the later stages of the conflict to operate Bofors 40 mm L/60 guns. The trained troops formed part of the anti-aircraft batteries of the Hong Kong and Singapore Royal Artillery (HKSRA) to counter the Japanese air threat in South-East Asia. They were also assigned to Indian artillery formations. In the early 1940s, several anti-aircraft units and training establishments were established throughout the country with Indian personnel being posted into these establishments from the infantry and artillery regiments.

With the increasing importance of air defence due to the ongoing World War, new anti-aircraft units were raised in the regular army, serving alongside the existing anti-aircraft units which were used for static roles. Separate units were established to tackle the high and low altitude bombers, and anti-aircraft units and formations were systematized on the basis of required gun density, with larger numbers of troops and guns being allocated to the highly vulnerable and sensitive areas compared to less vulnerable areas.

In July 1940, the government established training schools for anti-aircraft and coastal defence wings at Karachi. These schools predominantly trained Indian personnel including commissioned, junior commissioned and non-commissioned officers in anti-aircraft warfare. In August 1940, the British Ministry of Defence decided to separate the anti-aircraft units from the artillery department of the army into an independent branch based on the idea of towed artillery. In September 1940, an anti-aircraft training battery was formed at Colaba, in Bombay, to impart technical training to the troops. The first anti-aircraft unit of Indian Artillery was the Royal High Altitude Airship ('R' HAA) Regiment, which was part of the battery based at Colaba. In April 1941, both the light anti-aircraft unit called the 'U' Anti-Aircraft Regiment that was raised at Malir Cantonment (now in Pakistan) in January that year equipped with Bofors 40 mm L/60 guns, and the Royal High Altitude Airship ('R' HAA) Regiment, were renamed as 1 Indian Light Anti-Aircraft Regiment IA and 1 Indian High Altitude Airship Regiment IA respectively.

By 1942, the air defence branch had grown considerably with eighteen operational anti-aircraft regiments, of which nine were High Altitude Airship regiments and nine were Low Altitude Airship regiments. Besides the four brigades that were exclusively undertaking air defence tasks, one independent High Altitude Airship battery and two independent Low batteries were also in existence, with two training centres established to train the personnel in anti-aircraft warfare. By the end of 1944, this had reached a total of thirty three air defence artillery units. However, after actively taking part in the second world war on behalf of the British Empire, many of these were disbanded.

Post-independence

After the partition during independence in 1947, the units of the British Indian Army were divided between the newly independent nations. Out of the air defence artillery units that had remained in the aftermath of the Second World War only two units, the 26 and 27 Low Altitude Airship Regiments, were transferred India. The two oldest units, I Training Battery and Royal High Altitude Airship ('R' HAA) Regiment, were transferred to Pakistan.

In the aftermath of India's involvement in the Bangladesh Liberation War of 1971, India's air defence artillery was substantially modernized. The induction of modern air defence technology commenced with the deployment of the Tiger Cat Mobile Land-Based System in 1972. Subsequently, various weapons systems were introduced between 1972 and 1978, including the ZSU-23-4B "Shilka", ZU-23-2B guns, 9K33 Osa systems, 9K38 Igla surface-to-air missiles and 9K35 Strela-10 missiles.

During the period of 1987–94, India's Air Defence Corps recorded several momentous events that refashioned the identity of air defence in India. By the end of 1989, the Air Defence and Guided Missile School and Centre was established at Gopalpur Military Station in Orissa. Subsequently, the air defence wing at the Artillery School was moved to the Air Defence Guided Missile School.

In October 1993, the Regiment of Artillery was bifurcated and the Corps of Air Defence Artillery came into existence on 10 January 1994. The headquarters of the corps, the Directorate General of Air Defence Artillery, came into force the same day. Subsequently, the air defence wings and branches of the artillery present at various command headquarters throughout the country were bifurcated into the corps from the respective artillery units and regiments. Autonomous status was awarded to the Air Defence Guided Missile School at Gopalpur and the Air Defence Wing of the Artillery Centre, Nasik Road Camp was inducted into the Air Defence Guided Missile Centre. The day on which the Corps of Air Defence Artillery emerged as an autonomous corps of the Indian Army, 10 January, is celebrated as the raising day annually at air defence centers throughout the country.

The Air Defence & Guided Missile School and Centre and the Corps of Air Defence Artillery were rechristened as the Army Air Defence College (AADC) and the Corps of Army Air Defence in 1998 and April 2005 respectively.

Current overview

Army Air Defence College

Established in 1989 as an autonomous body, the Army Air Defence College (AADC) (previously Air Defence and Guided Missile School and Centre) is the training school for the personnel of the Air Defence Corps. Officers undergo both initial and regular refresher training, and soldiers are given a 2-month advanced training after their basic training. It also holds regular training courses and programs for gunnery, advanced gunnery, and leadership. The college is located in the Gopalpur cantonment, Odisha, with about 2700 acres of land. In addition to the troops from Indian Army, the school trains the Indian Navy and Air Force personnel tasked with the air defence systems. Training is also given to the personnel from friendly nations.

Band
The regimental military band was raised in 1995 at the AAD Centre. To date, it takes part in various national and international functions. Its string ensemble the "Celestial Sentinels", was raised in November 2001. A pipe band is maintained by Army Air Defence College in Gopalpur.

Regimental insignia 
In 1994, following the bifurcation, the government set-up the Mukherjee Committee headed by retired Major General A Mukherjee to design and select new regimental insignia including a regimental crest, flag and motto.

Regimental crest 
The Mukherjee Committee assigned the task of the designing the regimental crest to the National Institute of Design (NID), at Ahmedabad. After a series of reviews, modifications and improvements, finally the crest designed by Vijay Singh was adopted.

The crest depicts the neo-facet of the corps. It portrays a missile in silver tint, with radar antennae in gold colour fixed on the either side. At the bottom, the motto "" in English "Akashe Shatrun Jahi" is imprinted.

Regimental flag 

The regimental flag consists of two halves. The upper and lower halves comprise sky blue and red colors respectively. The upper sky blue color portrays the clear blue skies that are protected by air defence corps by the guns and missiles, which are depicted by red. The regimental crest is centered between the two halves

Regimental motto 
The sentence "" (Akashe Shatrun Jahi) of Devanagari script, which means "" was adopted as the regimental motto in 1996.

List of Units

Director General 
The office of "Director General of Corps of Army Air Defence" serves as the general headquarters to the corps. The position was first created when the Corps of Army Air Defence was bifurcated from the Regiment of Artillery on 10 January 1994. The post is generally held by a three-star general. It was first held by Lieutenant General PK Pahwa. The present DG is Lieutenant General AP Singh, AVSM, who assumed the office on 3 December 2019. Individual AAD Brigades, Regiments and Battalions come under operational command and control of the Army Corps, Divisions and Brigades that they are a part of.

President’s Colours

The President of India Mr Ram Nath Kovind awarded the President’s Colours to the Corps of Army Air Defence at Gopalpur Military Station on 28 September 2019 on completion of 25 years as an independent arm.

See also
 Indian National Defence University
 Military Academies in India
 Sainik school

References 

Administrative corps of the Indian Army
Air defence units and formations
Military units and formations established in 1939